A'ala Ahmed Mohamed Hubail (born 25 June 1982) is a Bahraini former professional footballer who played as a striker. With the Bahrain national team, he was the top scorer in the 2004 AFC Asian Cup.

2011 detention

On 5 April 2011 A'ala Hubail and his brother Mohamed (also a member of the national football team) were arrested by the Bahraini authorities and held in custody on an indefinite basis. A'ala Hubail, a trained paramedic, had attended demonstrations during the 2011 Bahraini protests and had reportedly helped provide medical assistance. The day before his arrest A'ala Hubail had appeared on a chatshow programme on Bahrain state television in which he had been aggressively questioned and criticised. Al-Ahli announced that the brothers had been dismissed from the club squad.

It was reported that he had received treatment in a military hospital after being tortured and that he may have suffered an injury to one of his feet.

On 23 June it was announced that Mohamed Hubail had been secretly tried and sentenced to two years in prison by the Bahraini special security court established under the martial law regime imposed in March 2011. A'ala Hubail's trial was reported to have begun in secret on 24 June 2011.

On 24 June FIFA, the world football governing body, announced that it had asked the Bahraini football authorities to provide information about cases of players detained during political protests. Following allegations of government interference in the sport after Mohammed Hubail's prison sentence and A'ala Hubail's trial and the suspension of over 150 athletes, coaches and referees for taking part in anti-government protests, Bahrain could face a ban from world soccer. Suspension by FIFA could prevent Bahrain participating in Asian Olympic Games qualifying round matches (due in September 2011). According to the Office of the United Nations High Commissioner for Human Rights in Geneva, the Bahraini trials appeared to bear the marks of political persecution and there were serious concerns that the due process rights of the defendants were not respected.

On 29 June 2011 the Bahrain News Agency reported that the Bahrain Defence Force military public prosecutor had announced that "defendants involved at medical and sport crimes" had been released, but trials would continue in accordance with Bahraini legal procedures.

Career statistics

International

References

External links
 

1982 births
Living people
Bahraini footballers
Association football forwards
Al-Ahli Club (Manama) players
Al-Gharafa SC players
Kuwait SC players
Umm Salal SC players
Al-Tali'aa SC players
Nejmeh SC players
Sitra Club players
Manama Club players
Al Hala SC players
Bahraini Premier League players
Qatar Stars League players
Kuwait Premier League players
Oman Professional League players
Lebanese Premier League players
Bahrain international footballers
Asian Games competitors for Bahrain
Footballers at the 2002 Asian Games
2004 AFC Asian Cup players
2007 AFC Asian Cup players
Bahraini expatriate footballers
Bahraini expatriate sportspeople in Qatar
Bahraini expatriate sportspeople in Kuwait
Bahraini expatriate sportspeople in Oman
Bahraini expatriate sportspeople in Lebanon
Expatriate footballers in Qatar
Expatriate footballers in Kuwait
Expatriate footballers in Oman
Expatriate footballers in Lebanon